Crassigyrinus (from , 'thick' and  , 'tadpole') is an extinct genus of carnivorous stem tetrapod from the Early Carboniferous Limestone Coal Group of Scotland and possibly Greer, West Virginia. The type specimen was originally described as Macromerium scoticum and lacked a complete skull. With subsequent discoveries, Crassigyrinus is now known from three skulls, one of which is in articulation with a fairly complete skeleton, and two incomplete lower jaws. Crassigyrinus grew up to 2 meters in length, coupled with tiny limbs and unusually large jaws. Crassigyrinus is taxonomically enigmatic, having confused paleontologists for decades with its apparent fish-like and tetrapod features.<ref name=Clack>Chapter on Crassigyrinus from Gaining ground: the origin and evolution of tetrapods,  by Jennifer A. Clack, Indiana University Press 2002, from Google Books</ref> It was traditionally placed within the group Labyrinthodontia along with many other early tetrapods. Some paleontologists have even considered it as the most basal crown group tetrapod, while others hesitate to even place it within the Tetrapoda superclass. Crassigyrinus had unusually large jaws, enabling it to eat other animals it could catch and swallow. It had two rows of sharp teeth in its jaws, the second row having a pair of fangs. Crassigyrinus had large eyes, suggesting that it was either nocturnal, or lived in very murky water.

DescriptionCrassigyrinus had a streamlined body up to 2 meters in length. Its limbs were tiny and virtually useless, implying that the animal was almost completely aquatic. Crassigyrinus had unusually large jaws, equipped with two rows of sharp teeth, the second row having a pair of palatal fangs. Studies have shown that Crassigyrinus may have been able to open its mouth as wide as 60 degrees, which suggests that it was a powerful predator with a strong bite. This strongly suggests that it was ideally suited for catching fish, and the animal was probably a fast-moving predator.

Several thickened bony ridges ran along the dorsal midline of the snout and between the eyes, and several paleontologists have suggested that they helped the skull to withstand stress when the animal bit prey. Crassigyrinus had large eyes, suggesting that it was either nocturnal, or lived in very murky water. It possessed large otic (spiracular) notches, probably accommodating a spiracle rather than a tympanic membrane.

Its peculiar stunted forelimbs were tiny and the humerus was only 35 mm long (the whole animal was about 1.5 m long). Various foramina on the humeral surfaces are very similar to those seen in Ichthyostega, Acanthostega, and lobe-finned fishes like Eusthenopteron''. The hindlimbs were much larger than the forelimbs, and in the pelvis the ilium lacked a bony connection to the vertebral column (a classic feature of aquatic tetrapods). Although there is evidence that the Crassigyrinus eventually lost its limbs, there is counterevidence in that it used its limbs for movement, as proven by healing in the bones in case of injury. The fact that there is a need to heal the limbs must mean there was an importance of the limbs at some point, and was then lost. The tail, only known from a few vertebrae fragments, is assumed to have been long and laterally compressed.

References

External links 
 Crassigyrinus

Stegocephalians
Basal tetrapods of Europe
Paleozoic amphibians of Europe
Carboniferous amphibians
Carboniferous Scotland
Viséan life
Fossils of Scotland
Fossil taxa described in 1929